The 2019 West Asian Football Federation Women's Championship was the 6th edition of the WAFF Women's Championship, the international women's football championship of Western Asia organised by the West Asian Football Federation (WAFF). It was held in Bahrain from 7 January to 15 January 2019. The tournament was won by Jordan for the fourth time, and Bahrain became the first host nation to not win the WAFF Women's Championship.

Teams

Participants 
Five teams entered the tournament.

Squads 

Each team must register a squad of 23 players, minimum three of whom must be goalkeepers.

Group stage

Champions

Statistics

Goalscorers

Awards
Golden Boot 
 Raya Hina
Golden Ball 
 Hessa Alisa
Golden Glove 
 Noura Almazrooei

References

External links

Official website
2019 WAFF Women's Championship at RSSSF.com
2019 WAFF Women's Championship at Soccerway

 
2019
WAFF
WAFF